FC United of Wrexham is a amateur football and futsal club based in Wrexham, Wales, that competes in the North East Wales Championship, the fifth tier of the Welsh football league system, and plays home matches at Bronwens Green.

The club was founded in 2020 by Andrew Ruscoe, Tom Winsper, and Morgan Churchill, following the dissolution of the Brickfield Rangers futsal programme.

History
The club was jointly-founded in 2020 by Prestatyn Town F.C. manager Andrew Ruscoe, referee Tom Winsper and former Wrexham AFC Women player, Morgan Churchill, following the disbanding of the Brickfield Rangers Futsal team.

FC United of Wrexham are very vocal on their support of the ownership of Wrexham A.F.C, under RR McReynolds Company LLC, a joint venture between actors Ryan Reynolds and Rob McElhenney. On 20 January 2023, FC United of Wrexham opened a fundraiser to help their under-12s Futsal side get a new kit representing the key landmarks within Wrexham such as the St Giles parish church. Three days later, Ryan Reynolds gave a £1,600 donation, above their fundraiser goal of £480. In response to this, the club decided to add the Deadpool logo onto the sleeve of the shirt.

The club manages a senior men’s football team which competes in the North East Wales League Championship Division, and male, female and junior futsal teams. The club's youth teams are futsal-focused, although the club has future plans in both football and futsal.

The club had Brad Miguel as a player who later played in the World Cup qualifiers for St Vincent and The Grenadines. The team has also produced players for Crewe Alexandra, Wrexham A.F.C. and Great Britain Futsal, as well as Ruscoe's managing club Prestatyn Town. The team plans to advance into the upper tiers of both Welsh football and futsal, while also securing grants to develop Bronwens Green, their home ground.

Managerial history and coaching staff

List of managers
Information correct after match played on 28 January 2023. Only competitive matches are counted.
Key
 Names of caretaker managers are supplied where known, and the names of caretaker managers are highlighted in italics and marked with an asterisk (*).
 Names of player-managers are supplied where known, and are marked with a double-dagger.

Notes

References

Football clubs in Wrexham
Futsal clubs
Sport in Wrexham